The 2004 Absa Currie Cup Premier Division season was the 66th season in the competition since it started in 1889. It was the first of three consecutive finals contested between the Blue Bulls and Free State Cheetahs. André Watson became the first-ever official to referee seven Currie Cup finals.

Competition
There were 8 participating teams in the 2004 Currie Cup Premier Division. These teams played each other twice over the course of the season, once at home and once away

Teams received four points for a win and two points for a draw. Bonus points were awarded to teams that score 4 or more tries in a game, as well as to teams losing a match by 7 points or less. Teams were ranked by log points.

The top 4 teams qualified for the title play-offs. In the semi-finals, the team that finished first had home advantage against the team that finished fourth, while the team that finished second had home advantage against the team that finished third. The winners of these semi-finals played each other in the final, at the home venue of the higher-placed team.

Teams

Log

Fixtures and results

Regular season

Round one

Round two

Round three

Round four

Round Five

Round Six

Round Seven

Round Eight

Round Nine

Round Ten

Round Eleven

Round Twelve

Round Thirteen

Round Fourteen

Title Play-Off Games

Semi-finals

Final

Points scorers
The following table contain only points which have been scored in competitive games in the 2004 Currie Cup Premier Division.

Cards

The following table contains all the cards handed out during the tournament:

Squad lists

See also
 2004 Currie Cup First Division
 2004 Vodacom Cup

References

External links
 

 
2004
2004 in South African rugby union
2004 rugby union tournaments for clubs